The royal cinclodes (Cinclodes aricomae) is a passerine bird which breeds in the Andes of south-east Peru and adjacent Bolivia. It was formerly considered to be a subspecies of the stout-billed cinclodes C. excelsior. It is 20 cm long and weighs 50 g with a heavy bill and dark chocolate-brown on the body, face and crown with whitish mottling and streaking on the breast.

This bird has a population of less than 250, and is classified as Critically Endangered. It is confined to tiny, humid patches of Polylepis woodland and montane scrub, and the major threat to its survival is the use of fire and heavy grazing which restrict the regeneration of Polylepis.

References

 BirdLife Species Factsheet

royal cinclodes
Birds of the Bolivian Andes
Birds of the Peruvian Andes
Critically endangered animals
Critically endangered biota of South America
royal cinclodes